The 2013–14 Georgia Lady Bulldogs women's basketball team will represent University of Georgia in the 2013–14 college basketball season. The Lady Bulldogs, led by thirty-fifth year head coach Andy Landers. The team plays their home games at Stegeman Coliseum, and are a member of the Southeastern Conference.

Roster

Schedule

|-
!colspan=12| Regular Season

|-
!colspan=12| 2014 SEC tournament

|-
| colspan="12" | *Non-Conference Game. Rankings from AP poll. All times are in Eastern Time.
|}

Rankings

References

See also
 2013–14 Georgia Bulldogs basketball team

Georgia
Georgia Lady Bulldogs basketball seasons
Bulldogs
Bulldogs